Childes may refer to:
Childe's Tomb (or Childes Tomb), Dartmoor, England
CHILDES, or Child Language Data Exchange System, a database of child language